German Cargo Services GmbH, operating as German Cargo, was an airline from (West) Germany that operated cargo flights on behalf of Lufthansa, of which it was a wholly owned subsidiary.

History
IATA regulations at the time meant Lufthansa could only offer limited cargo services. Therefore, German Cargo was set up as a non-IATA airline in 1977, accommodating Lufthansa's cargo charter operations. Flight services started on 8 May of that year, initially using a Boeing 707, and the airline was based at Frankfurt Airport, Lufthansa's hub.

German Cargo began operating scheduled cargo flights as well, mainly to Eastern Africa and the Middle East. The transport of live animals played an important role in the airline's business portfolio. The interiors of two Douglas DC-8 aircraft were refurbished to accommodate horses. The airline also specialized in the transport of large, damageable goods.

In 1993, Lufthansa reshaped its cargo businesses, splitting German Cargo into two independent, newly founded companies: Lufthansa Cargo for scheduled cargo flights (which inherited German Cargo's ICAO designation), and Lufthansa Cargo Charter for charter and lease services. German Cargo was renamed on 1 May of that year and briefly operated as Lufthansa Cargo Airlines. The German Cargo callsign was later resurrected for Lufthansa's joint venture with DHL and AeroLogic.

Fleet
In its early years, German Cargo operated a fleet of four Boeing 707 aircraft. They were replaced by Douglas DC-8s, which formed the major part of the fleet during most years of the airline's existence. From 1990, the larger Boeing 747 as well as the smaller Boeing 737 were used, that were later transferred to Lufthansa Cargo. In detail, German Cargo operated the following aircraft types (all of which were cargo-configured):

During the 1970s and 80s, the aircraft were painted in plain yellow. From 1990, a livery similar to the one used by Lufthansa was used, though with a yellow tail fin featuring the German Cargo logo.

References

External links

Defunct airlines of Germany
Airlines established in 1977
Airlines disestablished in 1993
1977 establishments in West Germany
Defunct cargo airlines
Lufthansa
Cargo airlines of Germany
German companies disestablished in 1993
German companies established in 1977